The Armenian calendar is the calendar traditionally used in Armenia, primarily during the medieval ages.

The Armenian calendar is based on an invariant year length of 365 days. Because a solar year is about 365.25 days and not 365 days, the correspondence between the Armenian calendar and both the solar year and the Julian calendar slowly drifted over time, shifting across a year of the Julian calendar once in 1,461 calendar years (see Sothic cycle). Thus, the Armenian year 1461 (Gregorian & Julian 2011) completed the first Sothic cycle, and the Armenian Calendar was one year off.

In A.D. 352, tables compiled by Andreas of Byzantium were introduced in Armenia to determine the religious holidays. When those tables exhausted on 11 July 552 (Julian Calendar), the Armenian calendar was introduced.

Year 1 of the Armenian calendar began on 11 July 552 of the Julian calendar. Armenian year 1462 (the first year of the second cycle) began on 11 July 2012 of the Julian calendar (24 July 2012 of the Gregorian calendar).

An analytical expression of the Armenian date includes the ancient names of days of the week, Christian names of the days of the week, days of the month, Date/Month/Year number after 552 A.D., and the religious feasts.

The Armenian calendar is divided into 12 months of 30 days each, plus an additional (epagomenal) five days, called aweleacʿ ("superfluous").

For example, which means "the year 1455." 

Months 
The Armenian month names show influence of the Zoroastrian calendar and Kartvelian influence in two cases (2nd and 3rd months). There are different systems for transliterating the names; the forms below are transliterated according to the Hübschmann-Meillet-Benveniste system:

Days of the month 
The Armenian calendar gives the days of the month names instead of numbering them – something also found in the Avestan calendars. 

Zoroastrian influence is evident in five names:

Holidays 
Per Armenian law, 12 days are declared as non-working days. Non-working days include:

See also 
 Public holidays in Armenia
 Armenian numerals
 Calendar of Saints (Armenian Apostolic Church)
 Tabarian calendar
 Georgian calendar
 Iranian calendar
 Zoroastrian calendar

 :hy:Հայկյան տոմար

References

External links 

 The Haik calendar (Origin of the Armenian calendar).
Armenian/Gregorian date converter

Literature 
 V. Bănăţeanu, “Le calendrier arménien et les anciens noms des mois”, in: Studia et Acta Orientalia 10, 1980, pp. 33–46
 Edouard Dulaurier,  Recherches sur la chronologie arménienne technique et historique (1859), 2001 reprint .
 Jost Gippert, Old Armenian and Caucasian Calendar Systems in The Annual of The Society for The Study of Caucasia", 1, 1989, 3-12.Jost Gippert: Old Armenian and Caucasian Calendar Systems [I: Frame]
 Louis H. Gray, On Certain Persian and Armenian Month-Names as Influenced by the Avesta Calendar, Journal of the American Oriental Society (1907)
 P'. Ingoroq'va, “Jvel-kartuli c'armartuli k'alendari” (“The Old Georgian pagan calendar”), in: Sakartvelos muzeumis moambe (“Messenger of the Museum of Georgia”), 6, 1929–30, pp. 373–446 and 7, 1931–32, pp. 260–336
 K'. K'ek'elije, “Jveli kartuli c'elic'adi” (“The Old Georgian year”), in: St'alinis saxelobis Tbilisis Saxelmc'ipo Universit'et'is šromebi (“Working papers of the Tbilisi State University by the name of Stalin”) 18, 1941, reprinted in the author's “Et'iudebi jveli kartuli lit'erat'uris ist'oriidan” (“Studies in the history of Old Georgian literature”) 1, 1956, pp. 99–124.

Calendar
Calendar eras
Calendar
Specific calendars